The Jean-Boivin River is a freshwater tributary of the Cyriac River, flowing in the unorganized territory of Lac-Ministuk, in the Le Fjord-du-Saguenay Regional County Municipality, in the administrative region of Saguenay–Lac-Saint-Jean, in province from Quebec, to Canada. The upper and intermediate course of the Jean-Boivin river crosses the Laurentides Wildlife Reserve.

The Jean-Boivin River is accessible by the route 175; other secondary forest roads have been developed in the sector for the needs of forestry and recreational tourism activities.

Forestry is the primary economic activity in the sector; recreational tourism, second.

The surface of the Jean-Boivin River is usually frozen from the end of November to the beginning of April, however the safe circulation on the ice is generally made from mid-December to the end of March.

Geography 
The main watersheds neighboring the Jean-Boivin River are:
 north side: Cyriac River, Simoncouche Lake, Simoncouche River, Kenogami Lake, Saguenay River;
 east side: Cyriac river, Lac des Îlets, Grimard lake, Cyriac lake, Lecompte lake, rivière du Moulin, Bras Sec;
 south side: Chavary lake, Ministuk lake, Petite rivière Pikauba, Lévesque lake, Yvette lake;
 west side: Hector stream, Richelieu lake, Petite rivière Pikauba, Minustuk lake, Cyriac lake, Pikauba River.

The Jean-Boivin River rises at the mouth of Petit lac Richelieu. The northern mouth of the lake is located at:
  west of the course of the Normand River;
  north-east of a curve of the Petite rivière Pikauba;
  north-west of Lac Grimard;
  south-west of route 175;
  south of the confluence of the Jean-Boivin river and the Cyriac River.

  towards the west, in particular by crossing on  Lake Richelieu, to its mouth;
  towards the northwest in particular by crossing on  Boivin Lake, to its mouth;
  north-east in a deep valley to the outlet (coming from the north) of lakes Eve and Adam;
  north-west, to the outlet (coming from the west) of Lac Lavade;
  towards the north in a deep valley at the start of the segment and leaving mid-segment of the territory of the Laurentides Wildlife Reserve, up to the confluence (coming from the 'west) of the Petite Rivière Jean-Boivin;
  north, then northeast, to Filion stream (coming from the south);
  towards the north-east in a deep valley, then bending towards the east to go around a mountain, to its mouth.

The Jean-Boivin river flows on the west bank of the Cyriac river. This confluence is located at:
  west of the city limit of Saguenay;
  west of Simoncouche Lake;
  west of route 175;
  east of Lake McDonald;
  north-east of the confluence of the Jean-Boivin river and the Petite rivière Jean-Boivin;
  south of the confluence of the Cyriac River and Kenogami Lake;
  south-west of the barrage de Portage-des-Roches;
  south-west of the confluence of the Chicoutimi River and the Saguenay River.

Toponymy 
The toponym "Jean-Boivin River" was formalized on December 5, 1968, at the Place Names Bank of the Commission de toponymie du Québec.

See also 

 Le Fjord-du-Saguenay Regional County Municipality
 Lac-Ministuk, an unorganized territory
 Laurentides Wildlife Reserve
 Petite rivière Jean-Boivin
 Cyriac River
 Kenogami Lake
 Chicoutimi River
 Saguenay River
St. Lawrence River
 List of rivers of Quebec

References 

Rivers of Saguenay–Lac-Saint-Jean
Le Fjord-du-Saguenay Regional County Municipality
Laurentides Wildlife Reserve